Belisario Villacís (born 1899, date of death unknown) was an Ecuadorian long-distance runner. He competed in the marathon at the 1924 Summer Olympics.

References

External links
 

1899 births
Year of death missing
Athletes (track and field) at the 1924 Summer Olympics
Ecuadorian male long-distance runners
Ecuadorian male marathon runners
Olympic athletes of Ecuador